Alexander Ukrow (born 7 December 1970) is a German former professional footballer who played as a defender and who has worked as a coach.

References

1970 births
Living people
German footballers
Association football defenders
1. FC Frankfurt players
Kickers Emden players
SV Meppen players
SV Wilhelmshaven players
VfL Osnabrück players
DDR-Oberliga players
2. Bundesliga players
German football managers
VfL Osnabrück managers
Footballers from Berlin